Withcote is a small parish currently comprising a number of scattered dwellings in Harborough, a local government district of Leicestershire. The population is included in the civil parish of Braunston-in-Rutland.

Buildings

Withcote Hall is a Grade II* listed building that is on Historic England's Heritage at Risk Register as being unoccupied and in a very bad state It is an early C18 country house, incorporating an earlier building. In the sixteenth century the house built by Roger Ratcliffe was described by John Leland as "one of the fairest houses in Leicestershire".

The Tudor Withcote Chapel adjoins the Hall and is protected by the Churches Conservation Trust and contains some stained glass attributed to Galyon Hone; a glazier to Henry VIII.

Sauvey Castle, an early medieval ringwork and bailey castle and is a Scheduled Ancient Monument, is also in this parish.

Close by is Launde Abbey which contains the Tudor monument to Gregory Cromwell, son of Thomas, who dissolved the monastery and built himself a mansion there.

Notable residents
Henry Smith (1620–1668) was born here, an English Member of Parliament and one of the regicides of King Charles I.
Henry Poole (died 1559), High Sheriff of Leicestershire: originally from Derbyshire, he acquired Withcote Hall by marriage  into  the Smith family and made it his principal residence.

References

External links

Villages in Leicestershire
Civil parishes in Harborough District